A World Without is a 2021 Indonesian film directed by Nia Di Nata, written by Nia Di Nata and NataLucky Kuswandi and starring Amanda Rawles, Maizura Maizura and Asmara Abigail.

Synopsis 
Netflix's A World Without is a dystopian sci-fi drama. The film is directed and written by Nia Dinata and Lucky Kuswandi. Set in 2030, ten years after the pandemic strikes. It's a story of three best friends, Salina (Amanda Rowles), Ulfah (Maizura), and Tara (Asmara Abigail), who successfully enter a dystopian organization The Light where after about a year of development they are to marry their perfect partner at the young age of 17. The organization is led by the charismatic leader Ali Khan (Chicco Jericho). The Light offers more of a futuristic world that empowers the younger generation with the goal to have them be the best version of who they are.

Cast 
 Amanda Rawles as Salina
 Maizura Maizura as Ulfah
 Asmara Abigail as Tara
 Chicco Jerikho as Ali Khan
 Jerome Kurnia as Hafiz
 Dira Sugandi as Nanik
 Richard Kyle as Aditya
 Dimas Danang as Endru
 Joko Anwar as Joko Liauw
 Willem Bevers as Frans
 Santosa Amin as Ali Khan's father
 Shalom Razade as former member of The Light
 Sri Sulansih as Grandmother
 Tatyana Akman as Reni
 Olga Lydia as News anchor
 Galabby as Santi

References

External links 
 
 

2021 films
Indonesian science fiction films
2020s Indonesian-language films
Indonesian-language Netflix original films